Air Chief Marshal Hakimullah Khan Durrani  (Urdu:حکیم اللہ خان درانی; b. 15 October 1935) best known as Hakimullah, is a retired four-star air officer who tenured as the 5th Chief of Air Staff of Pakistan Air Force, appointed in this post from 9 March 1988 until retiring on 8 March 1991.

Biography

Hakimullah was born in NWFP  on 15 October 1935 into a Pashtun family.

After matriculating from the Edwardes College in Peshawar, he joined in the Pakistan Air Force in 1956, passing out in 1957 where he gained commissioned as a Pilot Officer. Further training took place in the United States where Flying Officer qualified to fly the F-104 Starfighter and participated in the second war with India in 1965. Flight-Lieutenant Hakimullah, with speed of Mach 1.1, notably intercepted the Indian Air Force's Folland Gnat flown by then-Flight lieutenant Brijpal Singh Sikand, who was forced to land near at the airstrip in Pasrur, Pakistan. This claim, however, has been contested by India. In 1971, Wing-Commander Hakimullah flew Mirage-IIIA in the western front of the third war with India, seeing aerial actions against the MiG-21.

On 5 May 1976, Wing Commander Hakimullah was appointed the first commanding officer of the newly established Combat Commanders' School at PAF Base Sargodha.

In 1981, Air-Cdre. Hakim was appointed as Project-Director of Project Falcon, overseeing the acquisition of F-16s in the air force. In 1986–87, AVM Hakim served in the Air AHQ as its Chief of Staff under Chief of Air Staff. In 1988, Air-Mshl. Hakimullah was elevated as the DCAS (Administration) but was later elevated to the four-star rank promotion.
At promotion, Air Chief Marshal Hakimullah superseded at least one senior air officer, Air Marshal Shabbir Hussain Syed, the then-Vice Chief of Air Staff (VCAS).

In 1991, ACM Hakimullah eventually completed his tenure and retired to settle in Islamabad.

Awards & Decorations

See also 
PAF s' Chief of Air Staffs
 Muhammad Nasir Dar

References

|-
 

Pakistan Air Force air marshals
Chiefs of Air Staff, Pakistan
Pakistan Air Force officers
Pakistani aviators
Pilots of the Indo-Pakistani War of 1965
Pakistani military personnel of the Indo-Pakistani War of 1971
1935 births
Living people
Edwardes College alumni
Pilots of the Indo-Pakistani War of 1971